Valentina Nikolayevna Zhuravlyova (July 17, 1933 – March 12, 2004) was a Soviet science fiction writer.

Valentina Zhuravlyova was the wife of Genrich Altshuller, the inventor of TRIZ and a science fiction writer himself. They wrote many stories together, but because of anti-Semitic restrictions, they were published under the single name of Valentina Zhuravlyova.

External links
Valentina Zhuravleva. Stories

1933 births
2004 deaths
Writers from Baku
Russian science fiction writers
Azerbaijani science fiction writers
Women science fiction and fantasy writers
Russian women writers